Shakil Ahmed (born 12 February 1966) is a former Pakistani cricketer who played in one Test match in 1998. A slow left-arm orthodox bowler, Shakeel took 365 wickets at an average of 22 in his first-class career, but only played one Test, in which he claimed four wickets. He was born at Kuwait City.

See also
 List of Test cricketers born in non-Test playing nations

1966 births
Living people
Pakistani cricketers
Pakistan Test cricketers
Khan Research Laboratories cricketers
Rawalpindi cricketers
Cornwall cricketers
Sportspeople from Kuwait City